Rashad al-Shawwa (1909 –  1988) was the Palestinian mayor of Gaza for eleven years from 1971 to 1982. Before becoming mayor he was an outgoing local activist in the city. He was known by Israelis and Palestinians as the pro-Jordanian "father figure" of the Gaza Strip. He is the father of artist Laila Shawwa.

Early life
Al-Shawwa was born in 1909 into one of Gaza City's most prominent families. He was the youngest of five sons of Sa'id al-Shawwa, a former mayor of Gaza City and the South Palestine representative to the Supreme Muslim Council, a body that oversaw Muslim community affairs during the British Mandate of Palestine. Rashad's mother was Lebanese. Rashad received his primary and secondary education in public schools in the city. In 1934, he graduated from the American University in Cairo with a degree in politics and economics. That year he established the first sports club in Gaza called the Center for Youth Welfare. In 1935, he was assigned the post of caretaker of a Muslim shrine in Haifa, and during his residence there, he came into contact with the Syrian revolutionary Izz ad-Din al-Qassam who was leading an insurgency against British forces in Palestine.

During the 1948 Arab-Israeli War, he helped organize the smuggling of arms from Iraq and Lebanon to the Arab Liberation Army under Fawzi al-Qawuqji. He returned to Gaza during this time period. In 1950, he founded the newspaper Sha'ab al-Arabiya ("The Arab Nation"). It was the mouthpiece of the Palestinians and he presided over the editing, but it ended after an eight-month circulation. Shawwa was appointed by Egyptian president Muhammad Naguib to "cleanse" Gaza of corruption and any remnants of the monarchy of Farouk of Egypt.

Role as mayor
Shawwa was appointed mayor of Gaza by Israel in 1971. He took over responsibility for the management of the municipality and made the decision to not annex adjacent Palestinian refugee camps to the city such as al-Shati and Jabalia. He commenced the development of the economic sector in the Gaza Strip, working on major projects for the export of locally grown citrus to the Arab world, and establishing a juice factory which still exists off Salah al-Din Street. Shawwa was deposed in 1982 for failing to cooperate with Israeli military rule of the Gaza Strip, but his local influence remained strong largely because of his chairmanship of the Gaza Benevolent Society, which dispensed Jordanian funds.

During the First Intifada, Shawwa publicly sympathized with the participants of the uprising, saying "People here have reached a point where they don't see much difference between life and death under the insulting and degrading conditions of military occupation." On 28 September 1988, Shawwa died of a heart attack in his Gaza home at 79 years of age. That same year, the Rashad Shawa Cultural Center in Gaza was completed.

References

Bibliography

 

1900s births
1988 deaths
The American University in Cairo alumni
Mayors of Gaza City
Palestinian newspaper publishers (people)